The Unbeatable Squirrel Girl was an American comic book series published by Marvel Comics featuring Squirrel Girl. The solo series debuted in January 2015 and ran for 8 issues, and was relaunched in October 2015 as part of Marvel's All-New, All-Different Marvel branding and was published through to November 2019 with 50 issues, for a total of 58. Both series were written by Ryan North. Art was by Erica Henderson from the start of the publication until issue #31, with Derek Charm taking over as artist for subsequent issues. Critics have praised its comedy as well as the empowering portrayal of its heroine.

Milana Vayntrub was cast as a version of Squirrel Girl based on her The Unbeatable Squirrel Girl depiction in the live-action unaired Marvel Cinematic Universe (MCU) pilot New Warriors, before vocally reprising the role in the Marvel Rising media franchise (2018–2019). A podcast sequel to the comic book series, Marvel's Squirrel Girl: The Unbeatable Radio Show,  launched in April 2022. It is written by North and stars Vayntrub.

Publication history
Marvel registered a trademark for Squirrel Girl in July 2014, leading to speculation that the character would appear in a future film or television series, such as Agents of S.H.I.E.L.D. or Jessica Jones. In October, Entertainment Weekly revealed that Squirrel Girl would star in a solo series by writer Ryan North and artist Erica Henderson. Entertainment Weekly called it a "quietly bold move for Marvel", publishing "a female-centric comic that's intended to appeal equally to canon-heads and newcomers".

Starting in May 2015, the Secret Wars crossover storyline affected a number of Marvel comics and characters. Marvel announced in June 2015 that, after Secret Wars was complete, they would reboot their entire line as part of an All-New, All-Different Marvel rebranding. Though The Unbeatable Squirrel Girl was not part of the Secret Wars storyline, the series was set to be rebooted with Squirrel Girl joining an Avengers team. Marvel later named this team the Avengers Idea Mechanics.

In April 2022, Marvel Entertainment and Sirius XM launched Marvel's Squirrel Girl: The Unbeatable Radio Show which is a six-episode podcast series that acts as a direct continuation of the comic series. It is written by North, directed by Giovanna Sardelli and stars Milana Vayntrub as Squirrel Girl; the series is produced by Radio Point. Additionally, North "wrote an all-new 'Squirrel Girl' vertical comic tie-in" which debuted on Marvel Unlimited.

Plot

Volume 1
Doreen Green, known as Squirrel Girl, is a human superhero with the proportional strength and speed of a squirrel, as well as the ability to speak with squirrels, like her sidekick, Tippy-Toe. While originally introduced as a mutant, she was later retconned to be "medically and legally distinct from being a mutant." She can also command an army of squirrels, which she typically uses to overwhelm her foes. As The Unbeatable Squirrel Girl begins, Squirrel Girl has left her home in the Avengers Mansion to major in computer science at Empire State University. While moving into her dormitory, she fights the villain Kraven the Hunter and convinces him to go after more dangerous prey. Later issues had Squirrel Girl facing Whiplash and Galactus. A romantic interest named Tomas is introduced, who later turns out to also be a hero named "Chipmunk Hunk" and also has animal-based powers. During a battle with Ratatoskr, Squirrel Girl teams up with Thor (Jane Foster), Odinson and Loki to defeat the Asgardian demon.

Volume 2
Doreen and her dorm-mate Nancy move off campus into an apartment. During a lunch with her mom, Brain Drain attacks them, but it turns out there was a malfunction that they were able to fix and make him kind. They then dress him in human clothes and enroll him in Computer Science classes to allow him to upgrade his old WWII tech. The next morning Doreen is teleported into the 1960s. Nobody remembers Doreen except for Nancy. She finds a secret message from the past, so Nancy begins exploring ways to go into the past. She then meets Doctor Doom (from 1991 who was just defeated by Squirrel Girl and Iron Man in Marvel Super-Heroes Winter Special).  Nancy tricks Doom to travel into the past and rescue Squirrel Girl. In the past, Doreen found several other ECU students also stuck in the past and creates a support group. Doom and Nancy meet them, but then Doom reveals he plans on killing Squirrel Girl and all the other super heroes before they gain any of their powers. Nancy iPhone, which still shows the future, verifies on Wikipedia that Doom controls the future. The students track down Doom to Central Park and then teleports before them another student, Cory, and an elderly Doreen Green. It turns out Cory received a teleportation device from a crazy aunt, and since his Computer Science classes graded on a curve he teleported all the smarter students into the past. Nancy then adjusts the teleporter to go back randomly over the last several weeks and teleports Doreen multiple times, creating a Time Loop with dozens of Squirrel Girls, that all overwhelm Doctor Doom, not unlike his initial encounter Marvel Super-Heroes Winter Special, but with dozens of Squirrel Girls instead of Squirrels. Doom surrenders and returns all the Squirrel Girls to the correct time lines, except for the elderly Squirrel Girl, who becomes Cody's crazy aunt.

The next day Doreen notices somebody trying to catnap Nancy's cat, Mew. It was actually Howard the Duck investigating a missing cat case. Kraven then appears and abducts Howard. Doreen follows him to a billionaire madwoman named Shannon Sugarbaker, who is obsessed with cosplay. She has abducted human-like creatures, like Beast, Rocket Raccoon, the missing cat built into a cyborg, and a Squirrel that was fused with Wolverine's DNA and adamantium claws and was going to release them in a high stakes hunt.  Kraven and Doreen join them, but Sharon has a superpowered Cosplay outfit with Angel's wings, Iron Man's repulsors, Hulk fists, and Thor's hammer. Doreen and Howard sneak back into the mansion and Howard finds his own superpowered costume and rescues the other abductees. Howard is glad that he closed his case and Kraven learns humility after being hunted for the first time. He vows to only hunt hunters in the future.

Reception
Issue #1 was published on January 7, 2015, to positive reviews. The Unbeatable Squirrel Girl was praised for its comedy, and the character of Squirrel Girl was seen as empowering for being likable, smart, and having an average appearance unlike that of typical superheroes. The Guardian in particular applauded the cartoon-like artwork by Erica Henderson as unique in Marvel's publications. IGN regarded the series as "one of the best new debuts of recent memory". Reviews of issue #2 were positive, with PopMatters calling it a "breath of fresh air: funny, charming, quirky, strong, brave, unbeatable". Comic Book Resources write that issue #1 of the reboot was "silly as ever" and "consistently fun". Entertainment Weekly has said that Squirrel Girl will soon be "defending Earth from threats most cosmic".  The series was nominated for an Eisner Award in both 2016 and 2017, winning in 2017 as the "Best Publication for Teens".

Collected editions
The series has been collected into trade paperbacks:

The series has been collected into three mid-size graphic novels:

The series has been collected into Hardcover:

Graphic novel
Squirrel Girl has also been featured in a graphic novel written by The Unbeatable Squirrel Girl'''s creative team released as an independent story.

Novels
Squirrel Girl has also been featured in two middle grade novels.

In other media
Milana Vayntrub was cast to star as Squirrel Girl in the live-action Marvel Cinematic Universe (MCU) pilot New Warriors, a partial adaptation of The Unbeatable Squirrel Girl; while this pilot was ultimately unaired, Vayntrub vocally reprised the role in the 2018 animated film Marvel Rising: Secret Warriors and subsequent 2018–2019 media franchise, appearing in every instalment.
 In 2018, Sony Pictures announced the development of a Kraven the Hunter film as part of the Sony's Spider-Man Universe (SSU) with Richard Wenk writing and eyeing Antoine Fuqua to direct, in which the character would be depicted as an antihero, a concept originating from The Unbeatable Squirrel Girl. In 2020, the studio hired J. C. Chandor to direct and Art Marcum and Matt Holloway to rewrite the script. In May 2021, it was confirmed that Aaron Taylor-Johnson would portray the character, with the film scheduled to be released on January 13, 2023.
 In 2019, a stage play adaptation of The Unbeatable Squirrel Girl produced by Concord Theatricals and titled Squirrel Girl Goes to College: A Squirrel Girl Play'', began airing from Riverton High, with the title character portrayed by Alyssa Buckner.

References

External links

Interview with Ryan North, Comic Book Resources

Comics about women
Comics set in New York City